Bobrow may refer to:

Bobrów, Legnica County, village in Gmina Miłkowice, Legnica County in Lower Silesian Voivodeship (SW Poland)

People 
Andy Bobrow, American television writer and producer
Daniel G. Bobrow (1935–2017), American computer scientist
Martin Bobrow (born 1938), British geneticist
Mitchell Bobrow (born 1950), American martial arts fighter
Warren Bobrow, American mixologist and chef

See also
 
 Bobrowski